Mount Graham is a mountain in the West Coast Region of New Zealand with an elevation of 829 metres above sea level. Lake Kaniere is immediately east of Mount Graham.

References

Westland District
Graham